Pandit Dinesh (born 29 May 1955) is a music composer and percussionist specializing in Indian rhythms. He uses the tabla, conga drums, and more. Dinesh is known for his collaborations with West India Company, Dizrhythmia, The Pax Trio, and Blancmange. He is sometimes referred to as the "Godfather of Percussion".

Film & TV scores
Dinesh composed the music for a number of films and TV series, including "London Life" and the BBC Four mini-series India's Frontier Railways.

Live performances
Dinesh last performed at The Forge in Camden, London on 5 February 2015 at a night hosted by the Bagri Foundation.

References

Living people
Indian percussionists
Indian film score composers
1955 births
Indian male film score composers